Way of the Morris is a 2011 64-minute documentary about Morris dancing by Tim Plester and Rob Curry.

The film received preview screenings at the Purcell Room in London's Southbank Centre as part of an Arts Council funded festival, "5,000 Morris Dancers." It premiered at the 2011 SXSW Festival in Austin, Texas.

The film was self-released by Fifth Column Films in UK Cinemas in September 2011. Reviews were positive, with a Rotten Tomatoes rating of 100% based on 6 reviews, with an average rating of 6.6/10. It was later broadcast on Sky in the UK and New Zealand. Andrew Pulver of The Guardian called it "undeniably charming."

The film is available on DVD and can be viewed via VOD.

References

External links
 Way of the Morris at IMDB
 Official Website
 Production Company listing
 Buy Way of the Morris on DVD
 Watch Way of the Morris on Vimeo

2011 films
British documentary films
Documentary films about dance
Morris dance
2010s British films